Prolagus osmolskae is an extinct species in the genus Prolagus. It may have resembled a pika.

Range
This species was the northernmost record of Prolagus. Unlike other members of its genus, Prolagus osmolskae did not live near the Mediterranean Sea. Instead, this species lived in Poland.

Nomenclature
This species was named in honour of Professor Halszka Osmólska.

References 

Prehistoric mammals
Pikas